Ratha Paasam is a 1954 Indian Tamil-language drama film directed by R. S. Mani, written by C. V. Sridhar and produced by T. K. Muthusamy. The film stars T. K. Shanmugam, T. K. Bhagavathi, Anjali Devi, M. S. Draupadi, T. S. Balaiah and N. R. Vidyavathi. It is based on Sridhar's play of the same name. The film was a commercial success, and was later remade in Hindi as Bhai-Bhai (1956).

Plot 

Raja is a petty thief living around the streets of Bombay, indulging in pickpocketing. In the same city lives Rani, who makes a living through dancing. The two meet and fall in love. Raghu, the owner of a cycle company, lives luxuriously with his wife Sarala and children in Madras. Madhu, his manager, has been misappropriating the company's funds with the help of his lover Manorama who Raghu is later attracted to. The company is soon closed due to losses, putting Sarala and her children in poverty.

Raghu leaves for Bombay to seek new ventures, leaving his family behind. Sarala goes in search of him. One day, Raja steals Raghu's purse and discovers in it photographs which reveal that Raghu is his long-lost brother. He goes in search of Raghu, who does not recognise him. Sarala faces many troubles and after several incidents, all problems are solved and the family reunites.

Cast 
 T. K. Shanmugam as Raja
 T. K. Bhagavathi as Raghu
 Anjali Devi as Rani
 M. S. Draupadi as Sarala
 T. S. Balaiah as Madhu
 N. R. Vidyavathi as Manorama

Production 
When he was 17−18 years old, C. V. Sridhar wrote a story named Latchiyavathi and approached AVM Productions with the intention of making it a film, but AVM director P. Neelakantan rejected it. The story was later picked up for the stage by T. K. Shanmugam's troupe, T.K.S. Brothers and staged as Ratha Paasam. The play's film adaptation would later be produced by Shanmugam's brother T. K. Muthusamy under the banner "Auvai Productions", and directed by R. S. Mani. The screenplay was written by Sridhar. Cinematography was handled by Nemai Ghosh, and the editing by K. Govindasamy. Shanmugam and his other brother Bhagavathi, who acted in the play, reprised their roles in the film adaptation. Shooting took place at Neptune Studios, later known as Dr. MGR-Janaki College of Arts and Science for Women.

Soundtrack 
Music was composed by M. K. Athmanathan and A. V. Natarajan while the lyrics were penned by M. K. Athmanathan and Ku. Ma. Balasubramaniam. Playback singers are P. Leela, M. L. Vasanthakumari, Jikki, K. Rani, Kantha, (Radha) Jayalakshmi, Thiruchi Loganathan, A. M. Rajah and S. C. Krishnan. The song "Dullu... Dullu... Very Dullu..." is a satire on the economic situation and hypocrisy of Madras in the 1950s and of how people then lived their lives.

Release and reception 
Ratha Paasam was released on 14 August 1954. The film was a commercial success, and film historian Randor Guy said it would be "Remembered for: the moving story, commendable performances and the song ‘Dullu... dullu... very dullu...’".

Remake 
The film was remade in Hindi as Bhai-Bhai in 1956.

References

External links 
 

1950s Tamil-language films
1954 drama films
1954 films
Indian drama films
Indian films based on plays
Tamil films remade in other languages
Indian black-and-white films